Costa Rica competed at the 2004 Summer Olympics in Athens, Greece, from 13 to 29 August 2004.

Cycling

Mountain biking

Football

Men's tournament

Roster

Group play

Quarterfinal

Judo

Shooting

Women

Swimming

Women

Taekwondo

See also
 Costa Rica at the 2003 Pan American Games
 Costa Rica at the 2004 Summer Paralympics

References

External links
Official Report of the XXVIII Olympiad
Costa Rican Olympic Committee 

Nations at the 2004 Summer Olympics
2004 Summer Olympics
Summer Olympics